This is a list of Morehead State Eagles football players in the NFL Draft.

Key

Selections

References

Lists of National Football League draftees by college football team

Morehead State Eagles NFL Draft